Sem De Ranieri (4 June 1888 – 13 February 1979) was an Italian sports shooter. He competed at the 1920 Summer Olympics and the 1924 Summer Olympics.

References

External links
 

1888 births
1979 deaths
Italian male sport shooters
Olympic shooters of Italy
Shooters at the 1920 Summer Olympics
Shooters at the 1924 Summer Olympics
People from Viareggio
Sportspeople from the Province of Lucca